Water injection may refer to:

Water injection (engine), for increasing efficiency or power of internal combustion engines
Water injection (oil production), for increasing the amount of petroleum extracted from oil wells
Water injection well, a type of groundwater well through which water is injected into an aquifer system

See also
 Water for injection